Marc Gilpin (born 26 September 1966) is an American former child actor.

Personal life
He was born on 26 September 1966 to Wes Gilpin and Barbara Bushway. He has three sisters: April, Pattie and Peri Gilpin.

Career
Gilpin played Sean Brody along with Roy Scheider, Lorraine Gary, and his sister, April, in Jaws 2 (1978), by Jeannot Szwarc; Willie along with Henry Darrow and Kate Woodville in Where's Willie? (1978); and Dale along with Christopher Connelly, Meredith MacRae, Elissa Leeds and Joseph Campanella in Earthbound (1981), by James L. Conway. He also appeared in The Legend of the Lone Ranger (1981).

Filmography

References

External links
 
 
 

1966 births
20th-century American male actors
Male actors from Austin, Texas
American male television actors
Television male child actors
Film male child actors
American male film actors
Male Western (genre) film actors
Living people